This is a list of albums and singles by the Celtic rock group Runrig.

Albums

Studio albums

Live albums

Note: This table shows commercial live releases. Other live audio material has been released in the "Access All Areas" series for the official Runrig Fan Club, as shown below.

Compilation albums

Note: Only officially released compilations are listed here. More compilations are available but have been released without the band's consent.

Singles and EPs

Videos

Note: This table shows commercial video releases. Other video material has been released in the "Access All Areas" series for the official Runrig Fan Club, as shown below.

Fan club releases
A series of Access All Areas releases of live and other archive material were available via the band's official fan club - these include both CD and DVD releases.

References 

Discographies of British artists
Rock music group discographies